Qarah Dash (also Romanized as Qarah Dāsh and Qareh Dāsh) is a village in Oryad Rural District, in the Central District of Mahneshan County, Zanjan Province, Iran. At the 2006 census, its population was 510, in 105 families.

References 

Populated places in Mahneshan County